In Radiant Decay is the second studio album by Christ Analogue, released on April 8, 1997, by Cargo Music and Re-Constriction Records. Compared to the band's punk-styled live performances, the album displays more of the band's talent for combining industrial, techno and indie rock into an electronic music format.

Production 
The technology used to record In Radiant Decay included Digidesign's Pro Tools software, an Akai S3000, E-mu Emax II and Morpheus, Korg Prophecy, Kurzweil K2000, and Roland Juno-1 06. When asked about how producing the album compared to the band's experience working previously, Wade Alin stated:

Reception
Aiding & Abetting gave In Radiant Decay a negative review, calling "a middling rehash" and that "Christ Analogue has very little new ideas to bring to the cold wave (or is it cybercore? I get so confused) table." Larry Dean Miles at Black Monday described the album as "a direction of industrial music evolution that doesn't compromise in sound or soul as so many others have." Keyboard disagreed, calling the music "rich with emotion and intensity but devoid of the typical distortion and calamity" and "extensive use of sequencers and industrial beats combined with organic instruments create a 21st Century pastiche of sounds that escapes a tight pigeonhole." Sonic Boom also gave the album a positive review, calling it an "album of maturity and a summation of all the trials and tribulations that Christ Analogue was exposed to since its inception" while noting that "the use of lo-fi sound elements has taken its toll on the composite sound quality of the final mix down."

Track listing

Personnel
Adapted from the In Radiant Decay liner notes.

Christ Analogue
 Wade Alin – lead vocals, programming, guitar, bass guitar, production, recording
 Rey Guajardo – drum programming, programming, vocals, assistant engineering
 Markus Von Prause – synthesizer, sampler, programming, vocals, assistant engineering

Additional musicians
 Tracy Moody – guitar

Production and design
 Dana Brett – photography
 Jason Graham – photography
 Immaculate – cover art
 Shawn McClough – photography
 Robert Sydow – live engineering

Release history

References

External links 
 In Radiant Decay at Bandcamp
 

1997 albums
Christ Analogue albums
Cargo Music albums
Re-Constriction Records albums
Albums produced by Wade Alin